This article details the fixtures and results of the Syria national football team.

Best and worst results

Best

Worst

Results

1940s – 90s

2000s

2010s

2020s

Results by year

See also
 Syria national football team head-to-head record
 Syria women's national football team results

References 
 https://www.worldfootball.net/teams/syrien-team/21/